HMS Titania (pennant number F32) was a Royal Navy submarine depot ship. Most of those that saw service in the First World War were scrapped in the 1930s. Titania, however, saw service in the Second World War. She was scrapped at Faslane, Scotland, in September 1949.

History

Construction 
Titania was built in Glasgow, Scotland, by the Clyde Shipbuilding Co. (Glasgow, Scotland) originally as a merchant ship ordered by Royal Hungarian Sea Navigation Company "Adria" as Károly Ferencz József. She was launched in March 1915 and commissioned by the Royal Navy as a submarine depot ship in November 1915.

1915–1919: 11th Submarine Flotilla, Blyth 
When she was first commissioned, in November 1915, she was stationed at Blyth and under the command of Captain Stanley L. Willis. In December 1915, the Eleventh Flotilla became the first directly supporting the submarines of the Grand Fleet. The flotilla was formed at first from submarines  and  taken from the Eighth Flotilla and HMS Titania as their depot ship. Other submarines of the G and J classes joined the flotilla and the D-class submarines were removed.

An account of life on the ship is to be found in Hawthorne (1980).

On 3 June 1916, following the Battle of Jutland, HMS Titania instructed submarine  to locate and sink floating remains of the battlecruiser  which had been abandoned during the battle to prevent the capture of materials. No remains were found.

On 28 October 1918, Captain Frederick Avenel Sommerville was put in command of HMS Titania and made Commander (S) of the 11th Submarine Flotilla based at Blyth. The Eleventh Flotilla was disbanded in March 1919.

1919–1929: 4th Submarine Flotilla, China

Establishment of the 4th Flotilla 
At that time, another depot ship was already in service at Hong Kong, HMS Rosario. These three submarines were built by Vickers, Barrow, commissioned on 1 February 1910 and sailed with HMS Rosario to Hong Kong in February 1911. They were all sold in Hong Kong on 25 June 1919. HMS Rosario was sold for scrap in Hong Kong on 11 December 1921.

Submarines of the 4th Flotilla 
The submarines of the 4th Flotilla that accompanied HMS Titania and HMS Ambrose were all of the L class.

Seven submarines accompanied HMS Titania on the voyage to Hong Kong. She was raised, refitted and put back into service. She was sold in Hong Kong on 30 June 1927, the first L-class boat to be sold.

Voyage to Hong Kong 
HMS Ambrose, under the command of Cecil Ponsonby Talbot, left Devonport in October 1919 and sailed with six L-class submarines of the 4th Submarine Flotilla (L1, L3, L4, L7, L9 and L15) to Hong Kong, where she remained until 28 March 1928. The exact timing of Ambrose voyage to Hong Kong is not known. It appears that her arrival in Hong Kong was in January 1920.

After commissioning HMS Titania sailed to Malta. The Ship's Log shows that she left Chatham on 9 October 1919 and sailed via Sheerness to Portsmouth, arriving there on 14 October 1919. On 29 October she set sail for Malta, sailing via Gibraltar, where she stayed from 3 to 8 November 1919, arriving in Malta on 12 November.

On 18 February 1920 she and the remaining part of the 4th Submarine Flotilla, consisting of seven L-class submarines (L2, L5, L6, L8, L19, L20 and L33), under the command of Captain Frederick A. Sommerville, set sail for Hong Kong via Port Said, Suez, Ismailia, Aden, Colombo, Penang and Singapore. She arrived in Hong Kong on 14 April 1920. The ship's log records that HMS Titania weighed anchor and secured to Storm Signal Buoy at 10.17 a.m. on 14 April 1920. Gap Rock Light referred to in the Log is in the Wanshan Archipelago, to the south of Hong Kong Island. The reference to Waglan Light shows that she entered Hong Kong Harbour from the east through Tathong Channel and passed by the fishing village of Lye Mun (Lei Yue Mun) in Kowloon before docking. The exact location of Storm Signal Buoy is uncertain. It is likely to have been in the Admiralty area of Hong Kong Island, at the shore station  .

In Hong Kong 

Titania fielded a football team in the Hong Kong Second Division League and the team won the championship in the 1921/22 and 1923/24 seasons.

Service in Hong Kong 
In her service life she made a number of voyages in the Far East. Between 1920 and 1926 she sailed several times on voyages from Hong Kong to destinations around the Far East.

She was recommissioned at Hong Kong in 1921, 9 February 1924 and 5 November 1926.

The Ship's Log for the period 1919 to 1924 shows that Titania was based at Hong Kong on many occasions. When away from Hong Kong the destinations were mostly along the Chinese coast, Shanghai, Wei Hai Wei, Tsingtau, and other destinations round the South China Sea and Malaya.

 15 April 1920 to 24 June 1920 – stationed in Hong Kong

Return to Britain 
At the end of her service in Hong Kong, she returned to the UK via Malta. HMS Ambrose had already left Hong Kong on 28 March 1928 and returned to England.

A report in the Singapore Free Press and Mercantile Advertiser on 27 July 1929 notes that HMS Medway is undergoing trials.

It appears that Marazion was serving with the 4th Flotilla, filling the void left by the departure of HMS Ambrose. Note: submarines L23 and L27, mentioned in the article, were not present when Ambrose and Titania sailed to Hong Kong in 1920. It is not known when they arrived in Hong Kong.

A newspaper report in the Straits Times on 11 February 1930 notes the arrival of Titania back in England.  It read as follows:

The submarines that sailed to Hong Kong in 1920 were L1 to L9, L15, L19, L20, and L33, a total of 13 submarines. L9 was sold for scrap in Hong Kong. HMS Ambrose returned to England with L1, L2, L4, L5, L7 and L8. HMS Titania returned to England with six submarines, four of them from the those that sailed with her in 1920 and two more, L23 and L27.  The six that sailed in 1920 were L3, L6, L15, L19, L20 and L33. It is not clear which ones did not return to England with Titania.

1930–1940: 6th Submarine Flotilla, Portland/Blyth 

On 1 October 1930 she was commissioned at Chatham for the 6th Submarine Flotilla based at Weymouth/Portland.

In 1935 she was temporarily with the 3rd Flotilla, Atlantic Fleet.

On 16 July 1935 she was the Flagship of the Flag Officer Commanding Submarines at the Silver Jubilee Review at Spithead.

In 1936 she was attached to the 6th Flotilla, Portland.

On 20 May 1937 she took part in the Coronation Review at Spithead as the Flag Officer Submarines' Flagship.

In 1939 she was based at Blyth with the 6th Flotilla.

1940–1945: Holy Loch 

In 1940 HMS Titania was refitted on the Tyne and transferred to Holy Loch for the remainder of the war.

She was adopted by the people of Dorking, Surrey during the March 1942 Warship Week.

Harold Robson Conway) and their escort  (Capt. (Retd.) A. E. Johnston),  (Lt. Cdr. George William Dobson, RNR) and HMS Boarhound (formerly HMS Terje 2 (FY315), renamed on 19 January 1941; Skr. Sidney George Jinks, RNR).

In 1943 she served as a depot ship in sea trials of the Welman mini-submarine.

1945–1949: 5th Submarine Flotilla, Portsmouth 

In 1945 she was transferred to Portsmouth Naval Base to serve as a depot hulk for the 5th Flotilla.

Disposal 
In June 1949 she was broken up at Faslane.

Personnel

Officers 

 Cdr. Bill King spent a few months on HMS Titania in 1936 before he took command of the submarine HMS Snapper.

See also 
 Submarine tender

References

External links
 
 Naval-History.net - Photograph of HMS Titania with submarine alongside
 Naval-History.net - HMS Titania
 Gwulo Hong Kong history website
 Uboat.net warships website
 Dreadnought Project website
 Dreadnought Project website, China Submarine Flotilla
 HMS Titania | Hebridean Connections
 The South African Military History Society, Military History Journal, Vol 5 No 1 - June 1980, HMS Titania 1917-1918, by G. Hawthorne
 HMS TITANIA | Imperial War Museum

Titania
Titania
Titania
Titania
Titania
Titania